Shooting, for the 2013 Island Games, took place at the Warwick Camp, the Finger, and Cooper's Island, Bermuda. Competition took place from 14 to 19 July 2013.

Medal table

Medal summary

Men's events

Women's events

Open events

References

Island Games
2013 Island Games
Shooting at the Island Games